The 2021 European Wrestling Championships was held from 19 to 25 April 2021 in Warsaw, Poland. 428 athletes from 36 countries competed for continental gold at the European Championship. There were 168 Greco-Roman tournament entries, 155 freestyle competitors and 105 women's wrestlers.

Medal table

Team ranking

Medal summary

Men's freestyle

Men's Greco-Roman

Women's freestyle

Participating nations
428 competitors from 36 nations participated.

 (2)
 (11)
 (7)
 (22)
 (28)
 (25)
 (5)
 (5)
 (3)
 (6)
 (7)
 (12)
 (3)
 (20)
 (20)
 (5)
 (17)
 (6)
 (14)
 (1)
 (4)
 (11)
 (21)
 (4)
 (1)
 (5)
 (28)
 (15)
 (30)
 (2)
 (10)
 (6)
 (6)
 (6)
 (30)
 (30)

References

External links 
 Database
 Results book

 
Europe
European Wrestling Championships
International wrestling competitions hosted by Poland
Sports competitions in Warsaw
European Wrestling Championships
European Wrestling Championships
Wrestling